Alopecosa inquilina is a species of wolf spider found throughout Europe, Russia and Kazakhstan.

The species was described in 1757 in the book Svenska Spindlar by Carl Alexander Clerck.

References 

inquilina
Spiders of Asia
Spiders of Europe
Spiders described in 1757
Taxa named by Carl Alexander Clerck